Nora Nahid Khan is a Warwick, Rhode Island-born American writer of fiction, non-fiction, and literary criticism. She is currently on the Faculty at the Rhode Island School of Design in Digital and Media.

Early life and education
Born 23 October 1983 in Warwick, Rhode Island, Khan went on to study English literature at Harvard University, graduating in 2005. She was awarded the Thomas T. Hoopes, Class of 1919, Prize, which recognizes top senior theses, as well as the Edgar Eager Memorial Fund Prize. Khan continued her higher education with an M.F.A. in Fiction at the Iowa Writers’ Workshop at the University of Iowa under an Iowa Arts Fellow scholarship from 2006 until she graduated 2008.

Writing

Khan has published in Rhizome, Art in America, The California Sunday Magazine, Eyebeam, Longform.org and The Village Voice. She has exhibited or worked on exhibits at Koenig Gallery
 and avant.org.

Awards and recognition
Khan’s fiction has been recognized by numerous authorities in the genre. American writer, Katherine Vaz, for example, judged Khan the winner of the Hunger Mountain, Howard Frank Mosher Short Fiction Prize in 2008 for her story The Quarry. The following year, in 2009, she was nominated for the Pushcart Prize and was a finalist in the Best Short Story Award for New Writers Competition. In 2010, her short story Gunn, was judged runner-up in the American Literary Review Fiction Contest.

In 2016, Khan was the winner of a US$20,000 Arts Writing Award in Digital Art for an Emerging Writer, awarded by the Carl & Marilynn Thoma Art Foundation. Later that year, she was announced as one of the new cohorts of research residents at the Eyebeam Studios, a center for art and technology in New York City. The Eyebeam residency is a program for artists, writers, and researchers engaged with technology and technologists working in the arts. Khan’s research and writing at Eyebeam focuses on the history of computerized poetry, bots, and simulations.

Recent Work
Since September 2015, Khan has been a contributing critic at the Solomon R. Guggenheim Museum as well as a contributing editor at Rhizome., a not-for-profit arts organization that supports and provides a platform for new media art and artists and is based out of The New Museum of Contemporary Art in Manhattan. In October 2016, she teamed up with curator Aria Dean and activist Grace Dunham to develop the Open Score art and technology symposium at the New Museum.

Khan was published in the debut edition of Kill Screen magazine; Kill Screen Issue One: The No Fun Issue in 2010  and again in 2011 in the magazine’s 3rd edition, Kill Screen #3: The Intimacy Issue. Khan’s work has been published in a number of other printed and online forms, including the following titles by the Harvard Business School: Oprah Winfrey (TN), Bono and U2 (TN), and Gary Hirshberg and Stonyfield Farm. She has contributed to exhibition and artist catalogs, such as the 2016 publication Dawn Mission, edited by Bettina Steinbrügge, about the artwork of Katja Novitskova, published by Mousse Publishing to coincide with an exhibition at the Kunstverein in Hamburg 

In November 2016, she joined Christiane Paul (curator) and artist Ian Cheng at the Whitney Museum of American Art in a public discussion about digital art criticism. In February 2017, she was a speaker at the media art festival, Transmediale in Berlin as part of the festival’s 30th anniversary edition. She spoke on a panel called The Alien Middle with German artist, designer, and writer Sascha Pohflepp as well as Dulling Down - The Obsolescence of Intelligence with curator and theorist Inke Arns and Dutch conceptual artist Constant Dullaart. Her speaking appointments in Berlin coincided with the release of the Transmediale exhibition catalog, Alien Matter, to which Khan contributed an essay. Khan was also a guest speaker at the parallel CTM Festival, where she presented her original research Fear Indexing the X-Files with artist Steven Warwick

Khan is currently working on a series of long-form essays that address the questions of how AI and bots will affect human and artistic creativity.

References

External links
 Personal site
Faulty Inventory Control
 Towards a Poetics of Artificial Superintelligence
 DIS Magazine Archive
 Deep Mining; Deep Time, Nora N. Khan on Jussi Parikka
 Companion Text for Yuri Pattison’s Free Traveller at Cell Project Space
 Khan, Nora, Dreams of Neural Networks, in ETC Media, 2017
 Khan, Nora, What's in a Rave, POSTmatter, 2016
 Khan, Nora, I was a shameless self-promoter for a week and no one called me on my fake book, Hopes & Fears, 2015
 Khan, Nora, Casey Reas’s Disconcerting Software Paintings, The Village Voice, October 13, 2016
 ETC Media, Essay by Nora N. Khan in Issue 110
 Printed Matter, Lecture by Nora Khan at the launch of The 3D Additivist Cookbook, by Morehshin Allahyari and Daniel Rourke, 2016.

Living people
1983 births
People from Warwick, Rhode Island
American women writers
Harvard University alumni
University of Iowa alumni
21st-century American women